Wang Nangxian (1778–1798), Chinese:王囊仙;  was a female Chinese leader of the anti-Manchu White Lotus Rebellion along with Wang Cong'er during the reign of the Qing dynasty. Another female member of the rebellion along with Wang Cong'er, she declared herself divine and commanded her own troops in battle against the Imperial army. She was called 'Sorceress Wang' due to her use of 'magical powers' as a blessing for their strength, power and dignity towards her troops including Wang Cong'er and many other Chinese residents during ritual ceremonies.

Reportedly born in 1778, Wang Nangxian is of Bouyei descent.

White Lotus Sect

The White Lotus Sect originated during the Yuan Dynasty. Wang Nangxian along with Wang Cong'er led the uprising of the White Lotus sect against the Qing regime. She also reportedly used Kung Fu and acrobatics, and fought with a sword in each hand. Intent on avenging the death of her husband at the hands of the Qing, Wang led an army of men into battle against the Qing army. Though Wang's peasant troops were at an obvious disadvantage, they overcame and surprised the Qing troops repeatedly by using guerrilla tactics. The contemporary records of the Qing Court stated that "the deadliest of all the rebels are those led by Madam Wang, wife of Qi" and "it is said that all the rebel factions from Hubei and Shanxi were stirred up by Wang".

The Qing General Ming Liang eventually recruited local landlords to build forts and lock civilians inside whenever rebels were in the area, cutting off support from civilian sympathizers who were a key part of the rebels' supply chain. In 1798, a year later after Wang Cong'er's death in 1797, the Qing forces, with an increased number of warriors, ambushed Wang Nangxian and her fighters in the mountains near Yunxi, Hubei. After thousands of her men were defeated, Wang was forced to retreat. With no escape route available, she also reportedly jumped to her death. Despite being defeated, Wang Nangxian has also been credited with creating a precedent for revolts against Chinese imperial rule.

See also
 Wang Cong'er

References 
 Lily Xiao Hong Lee, Clara Lau, A.D. Stefanowska: Biographical Dictionary of Chinese Women: v. 1: The Qing Period, 1644–1911

1778 births
1798 deaths
Qing dynasty rebels
18th-century Chinese people
Women in 18th-century warfare
18th-century Chinese women
Women in war in China
Bouyei people
Suicides by jumping in China